Pymble is a suburb on the Upper North Shore of Sydney in the state of New South Wales, Australia.

West Pymble is a separate suburb to the south west of Pymble, adjacent to the Lane Cove National Park.

Pymble is notable for its gardens, bush reserves and heritage-listed residences and properties of architectural significance, such as the Eric Pratten House.

History
Based on settlers' accounts, the land that came to be known as Pymble was traversed by, and at least periodically inhabited by, the Cammeraigal clan or tribe of the Kuringai (also known as Guringai) Aboriginal people. The Cammeraigal had occupied the land between the Lane Cove River, Hawkesbury and east to the coast. They would travel from grounds at Cowan Creek to the Parramatta River via Pymble - passing west through the land where Pymble Ladies' College now stands, through the Lane Cove Valley and North Ryde. En route they would reportedly hold corroborees at the current site of the Pymble Reservoir on Telegraph Rd and "camped on the hill...at the junction of Merrivale Rd and Selwyn St."

Pymble is named after Robert Pymble (1776–1861), an influential early settler whose 1823 land grant comprised some 600 acres, around half the land of the region. The other half (plus a large part of St Ives) was granted to Daniel der Matthew's, another influential settler who established the first sawmill in the area.

The region was important to the early Sydney colony as a major supplier of timber for a wide variety of uses. The main timber varieties were blackbutt, stringybark, iron bark and blue gum. In later years it was also an important supplier of agricultural produce. It became widely known for the high quality of its produce and especially for its oranges which had been introduced to the area by Robert Pymble sometime around 1828 and which by later years were grown extensively throughout the region by numerous different growers following land sub-divisions.

Eventually agriculture and small farming gave way to residential development with residential sub-divisions commencing around 1879. The first bank - the Australian Joint Stock Bank - was established in 1888 in a then prominent house known as Grandview built on Pymble Hill ca 1883 by the son of local hotelier Richard Porter. Porter had opened the Gardener's Arms Hotel, also on Pymble Hill, in 1866. From this time the centre of commercial activity came to be at the top of the hill around the Pacific Highway and Bannockburn Road area, but with the railway station being located by necessity at the bottom of the hill development began to shift towards the new railway station at the foot of the hill. Pymble Post Office opened there on 6 August 1890.

Today, Pymble is a predominantly residential area with tree-lined streets, many substantial homes and gardens, numerous parks, nature reserves, and active pockets of commercial activity. Prominent landmarks include Pymble Station and Pymble Hill (Pacific Highway). The station is the centre of transport, shopping and social activities whilst Pymble Hill affords a view of the distant Chatswood skyline. 

Pymble also acts as a conservative area for its rich architectural history with a variety of Federation-style houses.

Heritage listings 

Pymble has a number of heritage-listed sites, including:
 Pacific Highway: Pymble Reservoirs No. 1 and No. 2
 982-984 Pacific Highway: Pymble Substation
 29 Telegraph Road: Eric Pratten House

Buildings

Significant buildings include:

 Ku-ring-gai Town Hall is situated at the top of Pymble Hill on the Pacific Highway. It was formerly the Sacred Heart Catholic Church, which was built in 1934, and is an example of the Inter-War Spanish Mission architectural style. Along with the presbytery next door it is heritage-listed.
 Pymble Chapel (formerly Pymble Methodist Church), on the corner of Mona Vale Road and Bromley Avenue, was built in 1879. It was the second church built in Pymble and is the oldest remaining building in the suburb.
 St Swithun's Anglican Church, on Telegraph Road, was built  and is an example of the Inter-War Gothic style. It is the only church in Australia named after St Swithun.

Significant houses include:

 Grandview is a two-storey, Georgian structure made of sandstone. It was built  as a bank but is now used as a home. It has a federal heritage listing.
 Merrivale is a local stately home in the Regency style and is considered one of the finest examples of its kind in Ku-ring-gai. It has a state heritage listing.
 Coppins, sometimes known as the Eric Pratten House, was designed by Walter Burley Griffin and built . It is one of three large houses designed by Griffin in Ku-ring-gai and is significant because most of his residential buildings were single-storey. It is an example of the Art Deco/Prairie style and has a state heritage listing.
 Macquarie Cottage, in Avon Road, was designed by William Hardy Wilson and built in 1918. It is considered a typical example of Wilson's work and has both state and federal heritage listings.
 Sacred Heart Presbytery is a two-storey house in the Federation Arts and Crafts style, with Gothic touches to the windows. It was built in 1907 and has a state heritage listing.
 Colinroobie, a two-storey Federation mansion built in the early 20th century, situated at the corner of the Pacific Highway and Clydesdale Place. It has a state heritage listing.

Gallery

Transport
Pymble railway station is on the Sydney Trains North Shore & Western Line.

Transdev NSW buses operate route 579 from Pymble Station (departing Grandview St) to East Turramurra (peak hours only) and route 560 from Gordon Station to West Pymble (half-hourly service).

Route 575 also operates along the pacific highway past the railway station (half-hourly service). It goes to West Pymble & Macquarie southbound & to Turramurra & Hornsby northbound.

There is a taxi stand on the eastern side of the station in Grandview Street.

At the 2011 census, 24% of employed people travelled to work on public transport and 54% by car (either as driver or as passenger) – a typical reflection of the Sydney area mode of transport.

Commercial areas
 Pymble Shopping Village - Grandview Street, adjacent to Pymble railway station
 Pacific Highway near Pymble station
 Bridge Street and West Street

Schools
 Pymble Ladies' College (K-12)
 Pymble Public School, a government primary school, located on Crown Road whose alumni includes actors Hugh Jackman and Chris Lilley
 Sacred Heart Catholic Primary School (K-6)
 Gordon West Public School (K-6) located in West Pymble (in a precinct formerly called West Gordon)

Parks and recreation

Pymble Park is located on the eastern side of the railway behind the shops in Grandview Parade. This park features many large trees, tennis courts, an enclosed playground and amenities.
Bannockburn Oval, located in Bannockburn Rd, is a large sports field catering to athletics, cricket, soccer, rugby and other sporting activities.
The Pymble Soldiers Memorial, located on Mona Vale Rd, is a memorial park dedicated to lives lost in all wars featuring rose beds, formal terraces and a hilltop view.
 Dalrymple-Hay Nature Reserve on Mona Vale Road is one of the last remaining blue gum high forests in Sydney. Visitors can "escape from the busy rush of Sydney life with a walk among the majestic tall blue gums and blackbutts. Check out the large hollows in the tree trunks as they burst with colours of the beautiful native birds, such as king parrots, rosellas and lorikeets".
There are also numerous untouched bush reserves which offer a taste of the original natural beauty of the region. Some include walking paths such as the Sheldon Forest track accessible via Warragal Road. "The track meanders through blue gum tall forest on the ridge tops, riparian forest along the creeks and open forest woodlands on the hill slopes. Sheldon Forest is of high conservation status because it contains some of the last remnants of the endangered ecological communities of Sydney Turpentine Ironbark Forest (STIF) and Blue Gum High Forest (BGHF)"
West Pymble Scout Group offers Scouting activities to young people aged 8-15 and is based at West Pymble Bicentennial Park.
Turramurra, Kissing Point, and Gordon Rover Scout Crews all draw membership from Pymble, and are active groups of young people aged 18-25, who are into a wide range of outdoor, social and community service activities.

Places
Walter Cresswell O'Reilly lookout, Pacific Highway, Pymble.

Demographics
At the 2016 census, the suburb of Pymble recorded a population of 11,051.  Of these:
 The median age was 40 years, compared to the national median of 38 years. Children aged under 15 years made up 21% of the population (national average is 19%) and people aged 65 years and over made up 19.7% of the population (national average is 14%).
 Somewhat over half (56.5%) were born in Australia; the next most common countries of birth were China 8.3%, England 5.2%, South Korea 2.8%, South Africa 2.8% and Hong Kong 2.7%. A little over two-thirds (67.2%) of people spoke only English at home; other languages spoken at home included Mandarin 10.3%, Cantonese 5.0%, Korean 3.4%, Hindi 1.0% and Persian 0.9%.
 The median household weekly income was $3,090, which is more than double the national median of $1,438.
 Separate houses constituted 80% of all residences. Another 17% are flats, units or apartments, while 2% were semi-detached.
 In the 2016 Census, Religious affiliation in Pymble was No Religion, 31.3%, Anglican 19.4%, Catholic 18.4%, Not stated 7.5% and Uniting Church 5.5%.

Notable residents
Past
 Belinda Bauer, actress and psychologist
 Errol Flynn, actor
 Joan Hammond 
 Hugh Jackman, actor
 David Leckie (1951-2021), former CEO of the Seven West Media (owner of the Seven Network). And former Managing Director of the Nine Network. 
 Stirling Mortlock, rugby union player, former Australian Wallabies captain
 Walter Cresswell O'Reilly, WWI, mayor, film censorship board
 John Symond, businessman
 John Clive Ward, physicist
Present
 Liane Moriarty, author
 John Newcombe, tennis player

References

External links

 Ku-ring-gai Historical Society
 Walter Burley Griffin Society
  [CC-By-SA]

 
Suburbs of Sydney
1823 establishments in Australia
Populated places established in 1823